Doru Popadiuc (born 18 February 1995) is a Romanian professional footballer who plays as a winger for Liga I club Chindia Târgoviște.

Club career
Popadiuc made his Liga I debut playing for Ceahlăul Piatra Neamț on 20 July 2013 in a match against Steaua București.

Statistics 

Statistics accurate as of match played 13 March 2023

Honours

Club
Steaua București
Cupa Ligii: 2015–16
FC Voluntari
Cupa României: 2016–17
Supercupa României: 2017

References

External links
 
 

1995 births
Living people
Sportspeople from Suceava
Romanian footballers
Association football midfielders
Romania under-21 international footballers
Romania youth international footballers
Liga I players
Liga II players
Kazakhstan Premier League players
CSM Ceahlăul Piatra Neamț players
FC Steaua București players
FC Voluntari players
FC Irtysh Pavlodar players
FC Politehnica Iași (2010) players
AFC Chindia Târgoviște players
Romanian expatriate footballers
Expatriate footballers in Kazakhstan
Romanian expatriate sportspeople in Kazakhstan